The 1957 All-Ireland Senior Hurling Championship Final was the 70th All-Ireland Final and marked the culmination of the 1957 All-Ireland Senior Hurling Championship, an inter-county hurling tournament for the top teams in Ireland. The match was held at Croke Park, Dublin, on 1 September 1957, between Kilkenny and Waterford. The Munster champions lost to their Leinster opponents on a score line of 4-10 to 3-12. It was the fifth time for Kilkenny to win a final by a point. An interesting feature of this match was the participation of the English actor John Gregson in the Kilkenny team's parade as part of his role as a GAA player in the film Rooney.

Match details

MATCH RULES
60 minutes.
Replay if scores level.
Three named substitutes

All-Ireland Senior Hurling Championship Final
All-Ireland Senior Hurling Championship Final, 1957
All-Ireland Senior Hurling Championship Final
All-Ireland Senior Hurling Championship Finals
Kilkenny GAA matches
Waterford GAA matches